Robert or Robbie Earle may refer to:

Robert Earle (born 1926), American game show host
Robbie Earle (born 1965), English-born Jamaican international soccer player

See also
Robert Earl (disambiguation)